Blender was an American music magazine that billed itself as "the ultimate guide to music and more". It was also known for sometimes steamy pictorials of celebrities. It compiled lists of albums, artists, and songs, including both "best of" and "worst of" lists. In each issue, there was a review of an artist's entire discography, with each album being analyzed in turn.

Blender was published by Dennis Publishing. The magazine began in 1994 as the first digital CD-ROM magazine by Jason Pearson, David Cherry, and Regina Joseph, acquired by Felix Dennis/Dennis Publishing, UK it published 15 digital CD issues, and launched on the web in 1996. It started publishing a print edition again in 1999 in its most recent form. Blender CD-ROM showcased the earliest digital editorial formats, as well as the first forms of digital advertising. The first digital advertisers included Calvin Klein, Apple Computer, Toyota and Nike.

In June 2006, the Chicago Tribune named it one of the top ten English-language magazines, describing it as "the cool kid at the school of rock magazines".

Owner Alpha Media Group closed Blender March 26, 2009, going to an online-only format in a move that eliminated 30 jobs and reduced the company's portfolio of titles to Maxim alone. Blender final print issue was the April 2009 issue. Subscribers to the magazine were sent issues of Maxim magazine to make up for the unsent Blender issues.

Indian edition 

The Indian edition of Blender was the title's first venture outside the United States. It commenced publication with its May 2008 issue, which featured Mariah Carey on the cover. The magazine was targeted at educated male city dwellers aged between 18 and 34. The magazine was launched through Dennis Media Transasia India, a joint venture between Dennis Publishing and Media Transasia, which also publishes the Asian versions of Blender and Maxim. The joint venture was based in New Delhi with offices in Bangalore, Chennai, Kolkata and Mumbai.

References

2008 establishments in India
English-language magazines published in India
Magazines established in 1994
Magazines disestablished in 2009
Magazines established in 2008
Magazines published in Delhi
Magazines published in New York City
Music magazines published in India
Music magazines published in the United States
Ten times annually magazines
1994 establishments in the United Kingdom